Asiyalan (Äseyalan) is a rural locality (a village) in Itkulovsky Selsoviet, Ishimbaysky District, Bashkortostan, Russia. The population was 44 as of 2010. There are 4 streets.

Geography 
Asiyalan is located 41 km southeast of Ishimbay (the district's administrative centre) by road. Urazbayevo is the nearest rural locality.

References 

Rural localities in Ishimbaysky District